John Breckinridge Grayson (October 18, 1806 – October 21, 1861) was a career United States Army officer and a graduate of West Point. He is well known for being a Confederate brigadier general during the American Civil War, his service during the Mexican-American War, and for his early death only three months after joining the Confederate Army of pneumonia and tuberculosis.

Early life and career
John Grayson was born in Kentucky in 1806 to Alfred W. Grayson and Letitia Breckinridge at the Breckinridge family estate of "Cabell's Dale". After his father's death when he was around ten John's mother married Peter Buell Porter. Grayson was appointed to West Point through his ties to three very powerful families the Breckinridges, Graysons, and Porters. He graduated in 1826 and became a second lieutenant in the artillery. He was first assigned to Fort Monroe where he remained for six years. He then served in a variety of southern forts from 1832 to 1835. In 1835 the Second Seminole War broke out in Florida. John fought at Camp Izard and then at the Battle of Oloklikaha. After the Seminole War, Grayson was assigned to New Orleans for eleven years. In 1847 Grayson left to fight in the Mexican-American War where he arrived as a captain of the artillery. Grayson later became the Chief Commissariat of Major General Winfield Scott. Grayson fought in many battles in Mexico including the Siege of Veracruz, Battles of Cerro Gordo, Contreras, Churubusco, Molino del Rey, Chapultepec, and the capture of Mexico City. He became a major for his bravery at the battles of Contreras and Churubusco in 1847. Later that year Grayson was brevetted to lieutenant-colonel for his actions at the Battle of Chapultepec. After the war he was assigned to Detroit, Michigan where he became the Chief of Commissariat for seven years from 1848 to 1855. He would hold this same title in New Mexico until he resigned to join the Confederate Army.

Civil War service
After resigning his commission, Grayson joined the Confederacy in August 1861. Because of his long service and military skills, Grayson was quickly appointed a brigadier general in the Confederate Army. He then immediately became commander of the East and Middle Departments of Florida. Soon after arriving, though, Grayson caught both pneumonia and tuberculosis. He died soon after on October 21, 1861, in Tallahassee, Florida, at the age of 55, not having fought a single battle during the Civil War.

Notable family
Secretary of State Peter B. Porter, Step-Father
Colonel Peter A. Porter, Half-Brother
Attorney General John Breckinridge, Grandfather
Senator William Grayson, Grandfather
Vice President and Confederate General John C. Breckinridge, 1st Cousin

See also

 List of American Civil War generals (Confederate)

Notes

References
 Eicher, John H., and David J. Eicher, Civil War High Commands. Stanford: Stanford University Press, 2001. . pg. 265
 Henry Clay, James F. Hopkins, Robert Seagers' The Papers of Henry Clay. Volume 3: Presidential Candidate, 1821-1824 (1959) pg. 379
 Scotch-Irish Society of America's The Scotch-Irish in America: Proceedings and Addresses of the Scotch-Irish Congress, 1st-10th, 1889-1901 (1890) pg. 206
 Stephen Hess's America's Political Dynasties (1957) pg. 245
 Clement Anselm Evans's Confederate Military History: A Library of Confederate States History (1890) pgs. 237–38
 Francis Bernard Heitman's Historical Register and Dictionary of the United States Army from Its Organization, September 29, 1789, to March 2, 1903: From Its Organization, September 29, 1789, to March 2, 1903 (1903) pg. 472
 Sifakis, Stewart. Who Was Who in the Civil War. New York: Facts On File, 1988. .
 Warner, Ezra J. Generals in Gray: Lives of the Confederate Commanders. Baton Rouge: Louisiana State University Press, 1959. .

External links

1806 births
1861 deaths
People from Fayette County, Kentucky
Confederate States Army brigadier generals
American military personnel of the Mexican–American War
Members of the Aztec Club of 1847
People of Kentucky in the American Civil War
United States Military Academy alumni
Breckinridge family
19th-century deaths from tuberculosis
Tuberculosis deaths in Florida
Deaths from pneumonia in Florida